Waterford City and County Council is the authority responsible for local government in the City of Waterford and County Waterford in Ireland. It came into operation on 1 June 2014 after the 2014 local elections. It is a merger of Waterford City Council and Waterford County Council under the provisions of the Local Government Reform Act 2014. As a city and county council, it is governed by the Local Government Act 2001. The council is responsible for housing and community, roads and transportation, urban planning and development, amenity and culture, and environment. The council has 32 elected members. Elections are held every five years and are by single transferable vote. The head of the council has the title of Mayor. The city and county administration is headed by a Chief Executive, Michael Walsh. The administrative centres are Waterford and Dungarvan.

Local Electoral Areas and Municipal Districts
Waterford City and County Council is divided into the following metropolitan and municipal districts and local electoral areas, defined by electoral divisions. The  municipal district which contains the administrative area of the former Waterford City Council is referred to as a Metropolitan District.

Councillors
The council has 32 seats. The following were elected at the 2019 Waterford City and County Council election.

2019 seats summary

Councillors by electoral area
This list reflects the order in which councillors were elected on 24 May 2019.

Notes

Co-options

Notes

Changes in affiliation

References

External links

Politics of County Waterford
Politics of Waterford (city)
2014 establishments in Ireland
City and County councils in the Republic of Ireland